Moment or Moments may refer to:
 Present time

Music
 The Moments, American R&B vocal group

Albums
 Moment (Dark Tranquillity album), 2020
 Moment (Speed album), 1998
 Moments (Darude album), 2015
 Moments (Christine Guldbrandsen album), 2004
 Moments (Mark Holden album), 1995
 Moments (Leo Ku album), 2007
 Moments (Barbara Mandrell album), 1986
 Moments (Andrew Rayel album), 2017
 Moments (Boz Scaggs album), 1971
 Moments, a 2015 album by Maudy Ayunda

Songs
 "Moment" (Blanche song), 2018
 "Moment" (SMAP song), 2012
 "Moment", a song by Aiden from Conviction, 2007
 "Moment", a song by Young Money from Young Money: Rise of an Empire, featuring Lil Wayne, 2014
 "Moments" (Hans Bollandsås song), 2010
 "Moments" (Emerson Drive song), 2007
 "Moments" (Ayumi Hamasaki song), 2004
 "Moments" (Tove Lo song), 2014
 "Moments" (One Direction song), 2011
 "Moments" (Freddy Verano song), Freddy
 "Moments", a song by Westlife from Westlife, 1999
 "Moment", a song by Victoria Monét from Jaguar, 2020

Film and television
 Moment (film), a 1978 Yugoslav film
 Moments (1974 film), a British drama starring Angharad Rees
 Moments (1979 film), a French-Israeli film
 Moments (talk show), a Philippine TV celebrity talk show

Other uses
 Moment (magazine), an American Jewish publication
 Moment (mathematics), a concept in probability theory and statistics
 Moment (physics), a combination of a physical quantity and a distance
 Moment of force, torque
 Moment (time), a medieval unit of time
 Moment form, a musical concept developed by Karlheinz Stockhausen
 Moment Rustica (ballet), a Martha Graham ballet
 Moment space surveillance complex, Russian military
 Momente or Moments, a musical composition by Stockhausen
 "Moments" (poem), a poem wrongly attributed to Jorge Luis Borges
 Samsung M900 Moment, an Android phone

See also

 Momentum (disambiguation)
 The Moment (disambiguation)
 Theory of moments